The 1940 United States presidential election in North Dakota took place on November 5, 1940, as part of the 1940 United States presidential election. Voters chose four representatives, or electors, to the Electoral College, who voted for president and vice president.

North Dakota was won by Wendell Willkie (R–New York), running with Minority Leader Charles L. McNary, with 55.06% of the popular vote, against incumbent President Franklin D. Roosevelt (D–New York), running with Secretary Henry A. Wallace, with 44.18% of the popular vote.

With 55.06% of the popular vote, North Dakota would prove to be Willkie's fourth strongest state in the 1940 election in terms of popular vote percentage, after fellow free-soil Plains West states South Dakota, Nebraska and Kansas.

This was the first election since North Dakota's inaugural 1892 election in which it voted for a losing candidate. Then, it narrowly voted for Populist candidate James B. Weaver. However, due to a fusion between Weaver and the winning Democrat Grover Cleveland, North Dakota cast a single elector for Cleveland as well. That makes this the first election in which North Dakota did not cast a single electoral vote for the winning candidate, or in which the state backed a losing Republican candidate.

Results

Results by county

See also
 United States presidential elections in North Dakota

References

North Dakota
1940
1940 North Dakota elections